Villeneuve-la-Garenne is a commune in the northern suburbs of Paris, France.

History
The commune of Villeneuve-la-Garenne was created on 9 April 1929 by detaching its territory from the commune of Gennevilliers.

Transport
Villeneuve-la-Garenne is served by no station of the Paris Métro, RER, or suburban rail network. The closest station to Villeneuve-la-Garenne is Saint-Denis station, which is an interchange station on Paris RER line D and on the Transilien Paris – Nord suburban rail line. This station is located in the commune of Saint-Denis,  from the town center of Villeneuve-la-Garenne.

The town is well-served by the Paris metropolitan bus system : several lines run through its territory. (RATP bus lines 137, 177, 178, 261 and 378).

Since 15 November 2012, the city is served by a tram (Line 1).

Demographics
As of January 1, 2019 there were 24,097 residents.  almost 37% of the residents were under 25 years of age.

Education
As of the 2015–2016 school year the commune had 1,280 preschool students, 1,973 elementary students, and 1,978 secondary students.

Junior high schools include: 
Collège Édouard Manet
Collège Georges Pompidou

Senior high schools:
 Lycée polyvalent Charles Petiet
 Lycée Michel Ange

The public library is the Bibliothèque Aimé-Césaire.

Twin towns – sister cities

Villeneuve-la-Garenne is twinned with:
 Hof, Germany

Notable people
Éric Marester, footballer
Romain Habran, footballer

Economy

Villeneuve-la-Garenne is home to shipyards:

 Chantier de la Société Française de Construction navale
 Vanpraet Chantiers Navals du Nord

See also
Communes of the Hauts-de-Seine department

References

External links

Official website (in French)

Communes of Hauts-de-Seine